July 16 - Eastern Orthodox Church calendar - July 18

All fixed commemorations below are celebrated on July 30 by Old Calendar.

For July 17th, Orthodox Churches on the Old Calendar commemorate the Saints listed on July 4.

Saints
 Great martyr Marina (Margaret) of Antioch in Pisidia (4th century)
 Saint Euphrasius of Ionopolis, Bishop.
 Venerable Apostles of the Slavs: Cyril and Methodius, Clement of Ohrid, Sava, Angelar, Gorazd and Nahum of Ochrid.  (see also: May 11, July 27)

Pre-Schism Western saints
 The Holy Martyrs of Scillium beheaded in Carthage (180):
 Martyrs Speratus and Veronica, Nartzalus, Cittinus, Veturius, Felix, Aquilinus, Laetantius, Januaria, Generosa, Vestia, Donata, and Secunda.
 Saint Marcellina, born in Rome, she was the elder sister of St Ambrose of Milan and St Satyrus (398)
 Venerable Alexios the Man of God, in Rome (411)  (see also: March 17)
 Saint Generosus of Tivoli, venerated in Tivoli in Italy, where his relics are enshrined in the Cathedral.
 Saint Cynllo, a British saint to whom several churches are dedicated in Wales (5th century)
 Saint Theodosius of Auxerre, Bishop of Auxerre in France c 507-516, who assisted in 511 at the First Council of Orléans (516)
 Saint Ennodius (Magnus Felix Ennodius), a Gallo-Roman who became Bishop of Pavia in Italy, Confessor (521)
 Saint Frédégand (Frégô), born in Ireland, he was a disciple of St Foillan, and became a monk and Abbot of Kerkelodor Abbey near Antwerp in Belgium (c. 740)
 Saint Turninus, a priest from Ireland who worked with St Foillan in Holland, and also near Antwerp in Belgium (8th century) Almost certainly the same as Saint Fredigand.
 Child-martyr Prince Kenelm of Wales, son of King Coenwulf of Mercia in England, murdered in the forest of Clent and buried in Winchcombe (c. 821)
 Saint Andrew Zorard, born in Poland, he lived as a hermit on Mount Zobar in Hungary (c. 1010)

Post-Schism Orthodox saints
 Saint Timothy, Fool-for-Christ, of Svyatogorsk,  near Pskov (1563)
 Venerable Irenarchus, Abbot of Solovetsky Monastery (1628) 
 Venerable Leonid, founder of Ust-Neduma Monastery in Vologda, Abbot (1654)

New martyrs and confessors
 Royal Martyrs of Russia: Martyrdom of the Romanovs (17 July 1918)  (see also: July 4)

Other commemorations
 Translation of the relics of St. Lazarus the Wonderworker, of Mt. Galesion, near Ephesus (1054)  (see also: November 7, July 18)
 Icon of the Mother of God of Sviatogorsk (1569)
 Slaying of Bishop John (Bulin) of Pechersk Pskov Caves (1941)
 Glorification (1996) and translation of the relics (2000) of St. Gabriel (Zyryanov) of Seven Lakes Monastery in Kazan, and of Pskov-Eleazar Monastery in Pskov (1915)  (see also: September 24)
 Second finding of the relics (1998) of St. Alexander of Svir (1533)

Icon gallery

Notes

References

Sources
 July 17/July 30. Orthodox Calendar (PRAVOSLAVIE.RU).
 July 30 / July 17. HOLY TRINITY RUSSIAN ORTHODOX CHURCH (A parish of the Patriarchate of Moscow).
 July 17. OCA - The Lives of the Saints.
 July 17. The Year of Our Salvation - Holy Transfiguration Monastery, Brookline, Massachusetts. 
 The Autonomous Orthodox Metropolia of Western Europe and the Americas (ROCOR). St. Hilarion Calendar of Saints for the year of our Lord 2004. St. Hilarion Press (Austin, TX). p. 53.
 The Seventeenth Day of the Month of July. Orthodoxy in China.
 July 17. Latin Saints of the Orthodox Patriarchate of Rome.
 The Roman Martyrology. Transl. by the Archbishop of Baltimore. Last Edition, According to the Copy Printed at Rome in 1914. Revised Edition, with the Imprimatur of His Eminence Cardinal Gibbons. Baltimore: John Murphy Company, 1916. pp. 210–211.
 Rev. Richard Stanton. A Menology of England and Wales, or, Brief Memorials of the Ancient British and English Saints Arranged According to the Calendar, Together with the Martyrs of the 16th and 17th Centuries. London: Burns & Oates, 1892. p. 345.

 Greek Sources
 Great Synaxaristes:  17 ΙΟΥΛΙΟΥ. ΜΕΓΑΣ ΣΥΝΑΞΑΡΙΣΤΗΣ.
  Συναξαριστής. 17 Ιουλίου. ECCLESIA.GR. (H ΕΚΚΛΗΣΙΑ ΤΗΣ ΕΛΛΑΔΟΣ). 
  17/07/2020. Ορθόδοξος Συναξαριστής.

 Russian Sources
  30 июля (17 июля). Православная Энциклопедия под редакцией Патриарха Московского и всея Руси Кирилла (электронная версия). (Orthodox Encyclopedia - Pravenc.ru).
  17 июля по старому стилю / 30 июля по новому стилю. СПЖ "Союз православных журналистов". 2020.
  17 июля (ст.ст.) 30 июля 2020 (нов. ст.). Русская Православная Церковь Отдел внешних церковных связей. (DECR).

July in the Eastern Orthodox calendar